"Déjà Vu" is a song by Romanian musician Bob Taylor and Romanian recording artist Inna for the latter's debut studio album, Hot (2009). Released in June 2009, it was written and produced by Sebastian Barac, Radu Bolfea and Marcel Botezan. Musically, the single is of the dance genre, and originally contained the vocals of Romanian singer Alessia. However, after a feud over compensation between Taylor and her, the song was handed to Inna, although the early version had already been released.

When premiering the new version of "Déjà Vu", Taylor and Inna opted for pseudonyms before revealing their identity later. In order to accompany the single, a music video was shot at a club in Neptun, Romania by Tom Boxer, and it initially did not feature Inna until another version of the visual showed footage of her in Turkey. Commercially, the recording experienced success in European countries, reaching the top ten of the charts in Greece, the Commonwealth of Independent States, France and Romania, among others. "Déjà Vu" was certified Gold by the Dutch Association of Producers and Importers of Image and Sound Carriers (NVPI) for selling over 10,000 copies in the Netherlands.

Background and controversy

Initially, a version of the song featuring the vocals of Romanian singer Alessia was released in early 2009, and drew comparisons to Inna's "Hot" (2008) at that time. The track was further credited to Bogdan Croitoru, also known as Fizz, which opted for the pseudonym of Bob Taylor. However, following a dispute over compensation, the artists decided to quit their collaboration and Alessia demanded her vocals to be replaced with others, although "Déjà Vu" had already experienced commercial success in Romania and had been heavily played in night clubs. Particularly, the track was handed to Inna to re-record. According to Alessia, whose voice is a semi-tone higher than Inna's, the latter had a disadvantage when re-recording the song as it was not in her tonality, and this could not be changed because the track was already finished.

The new version of the dance single with Inna's vocals was initially made available for consumption as credited to Bob Taylor and Anni (backwards to Inna), as the artists wanted to "stay in the shade" reportedly because "the Romanian audience has some bias". Following a time of speculation and controversy, the performers of the recording were finally revealed, with Inna writing on her website; "I consider that a good song can be promoted and listened to without knowing by whom it is composed or who interprets it. With the help of 'Déjà Vu', I have showed this thing and, look, again, you – the audience – had the biggest intake. I thank you and don't forget that you are the only ones that can make a hit out of a song."

Music video
An accompanying music video for "Déjà Vu" was shot by Tom Boxer in a club in Neptun, Romania in June 2009. It was filmed in the period of Alessia's and Croitoru's argument over compensation, with Inna initially not appearing in it, before another version was released on 7 November 2009 incorporating footage of the singer in Turkey. The visual opens with a glass falling down in front of a black backdrop, with it breaking, and then sees Taylor mixing in a club. Following this, the focus alternates on female strippers and a group of partying people. Subsequently, a girl sporting an orange dress walks around the club, eventually drawing the attention of a male, with her sitting at the bar and watching a man mixing drinks. After the group of people—including masked men—further perform to the track, the clip ends with a shot of one's white T-shirt with an unknown blue figure on it. Scenes interspersed through the main clip portray Inna posing in swimsuit during a ship trip, footage of loudspeakers or two topless men fighting sporting yellow pants.

Commercial performance 
Upon its release, "Déjà Vu" experienced commercial success in Europe. On the native Nielsen Music Control chart, the song peaked at number six in September 2009, and further reached the top ten in various territories. While the recording achieved a peak position at number two in Greece, it charted at number four in the Commonwealth of Independent States, and in France it became Inna's third top ten single at number six. Additionally, on Spain's PROMUSICAE chart, "Déjà Vu" debuted at number 31 on 2 May 2010 and climbed to number 15 on 15 August 2010, lasting for 26 consecutive weeks. The song reached number 60 on the UK Singles Chart. In Austria, "Déjà Vu" debuted at number 25, scoring Inna's highest debut on the chart and her first top 40 entry there. A top ten hit in the Netherlands, the single was certified Gold by the Dutch Association of Producers and Importers of Image and Sound Carriers (NVPI) for selling over 10,000 copies in the country.

Track listing 
Official versions and remixes
"Déjà Vu (Radio Edit)" – 3:27
"Déjà Vu (Play & Win Radio Edit Version)" – 4:24
"Déjà Vu (UK Radio Edit Version)" – 2:33
"Déjà Vu (Wideboys Stadium Radio Edit)" - 3:19
"Déjà Vu (Wideboys Stadium Club Remix)" - 5:58
"Déjà Vu (Wideboys Stadium Dub Remix)" - 5:59
"Déjà Vu (N-Force Radio Edit)" – 3:02
"Déjà Vu (N-Force Mix)" – 5:27

Credits and personnel 
Credits adapted from the liner notes of Hot.

Bob Taylor – lead vocals
Inna – lead vocals
Sebastian Barac – producer, composer
Radu Bolfea – producer, composer
Marcel Botezan – producer, composer

Charts

Weekly charts

Year-end charts

Certifications and sales

Release history

Notes

References

External links
Music video of this song on YouTube

Inna songs
Dance-pop songs
2009 singles
English-language Romanian songs
2009 songs
Song recordings produced by Play & Win